Marjan Pengov (19 April 1913 – 1991) was a Yugoslav fencer. He competed in the individual and team foil events at the 1936 Summer Olympics.

References

External links
 

1913 births
1991 deaths
Yugoslav male foil fencers
Olympic fencers of Yugoslavia
Fencers at the 1936 Summer Olympics
Sportspeople from Ljubljana
Slovenian male foil fencers